Václav Smetáček (30 September 1906 in Brno – 18 February 1986 in Prague) was a Czech conductor, composer, and oboist.

He studied in Prague among others with Jaroslav Křička, conducting with Metod Doležil and Pavel Dědeček, musicology, aesthetics, and philosophy at Charles University, receiving his doctorate in musicology in 1933.
He was the founder and member of the Prague Wind Quintet (1928), with whom he performed, composed and arranged compositions for it. From 1930 to 1933, he was a member of the Czech Philharmonic Orchestra, and from 1934 to 1943, he worked on Czech Radio as conductor and editor. From 1945 to 1966 he worked as a pedagogue at the Prague Conservatory and Academy of Performing Arts in Prague.

As a conductor of the Prague Symphony Orchestra, he made several innovations. He enlarged its repertoire with the music of 20th Century and larger vocal symphonic works (including those of Rejcha, Mozart, Cherubini, Dvořák, Foerster, Martinů, Orff, Kabeláč, and Fišer). From 1938, he performed abroad. He was invited later to the many important European and overseas music centres. He primarily devoted himself to the concert music, but he also studied operas. He received many awards for his creations.

His discography includes include suites from Rimsky-Korsakov's operas Le Coq d'Or and the Legend of the Invisible City of Kitezh, Carl Orff's Carmina Burana, Mendelssohn's A Midsummer Night's Dream, The Hebrides and Meeresstille und glückliche Fahrt, Tchaikovsky's Symphony No. 1 "Winter Daydreams", J.B. Foerster's Symphony No.4 "Velika noc", Bizet's L'Arlésienne and Chabrier's España and Dvorak's St Ludmila.

References

External links

1906 births
1986 deaths
Czech classical composers
Czech male classical composers
Czech classical oboists
Male oboists
Czech conductors (music)
Male conductors (music)
Prague Conservatory alumni
20th-century classical composers
20th-century conductors (music)
20th-century Czech male musicians